The 2013 Ultimate Indoor Football League season was  the third season of the league. The league contracted down to just 6 teams.

Team movement

Expansion
On May 29, 2013, the Missouri Monsters were announced as the first expansion team for the 2013 season. On July 23, 2012, the league announced that the Indianapolis Panthers would be joining the UIFL, however they would later be removed from the league prior to the beginning of the season. On August 12, 2012, it was announced that the Sarasota, Florida (Sarasota Thunder) marked would be joining the UIFL. On September 27, 2012, the fourth and final expansion team was accepted into the UIFL, the Corpus Christi Fury.

Retraction
The Cincinnati Commandos, Eastern Kentucky Drillers, Erie Explosion and Marion Blue Racers all left the UIFL to join the Continental Indoor Football League (CIFL). The league also announced that the Western Pennsylvania Sting would relocate to Coral Gables, Florida as the Miami Sting, however the Sting never played a game, folding before the season began.

Standings

y - clinched conference title
x - clinched playoff spot

2013 Playoffs

References

2013 Ultimate Indoor Football League season